Johann Paulus Appler (13 June 1892 – 21 December 1978) was a member of the NSDAP (Nazi Party) and World War I veteran.

World War I service
Born in 1892, from 1898 to 1912, Appler attended the elementary and advanced training school in Urphertshofen in Middle Franconia. In 1912 he joined the 10th "King" infantry regiment of the Bavarian Army and fought in the First World War from August 1914 to 1918, where he took part as a platoon leader and received several war awards. In 1920 he was released from the Reichswehr and from 1922 to 1935 worked as a Reich finance officer. He also worked until 1928 as a customs officer in the border service, then as a tax secretary in the Gunzenhausen revenue service.

Joining the Nazi Party
Between 1925 and 1928 Appler was a member of the Völkisch-Social Bloc, a right-wing electoral alliance in post World War I Germany. On 1 August 1928 he joined the Nazi Party (membership number 95.219) and took over the leadership of the Gunzenhausen group in the Gau Franconia region until 1930. He headed the party's district of Gunzenhausen until 1932, then the district there until November 1940. He was also Gauredner (Speaker) of the party and a member of the SA in the rank of a storm leader. In 1931 Appler founded the SS-group in Gunzenhausen and was its commander as Untersturmführer.

On 21 January 1933 Appler moved into the Reichstag for politician Wilhelm Stegmann, who had left the parliament. He retained his mandate even after the Nazis seized power in that year, until the end of the war. Already honorary second mayor of Gunzenhausen since 28 April 1933, Appler became first mayor on 1 October 1935 and remained so until April 1945.

Escape, later life and death
According to documents from the central office in Ludwigsburg, Appler managed to escape to Spain in 1945, from where he left for Cairo, Egypt in 1946. There he converted to Islam and lived under the name Salah Chaffar. After returning to Germany, he was charged with breaching the peace in September 1949 and sentenced to six months in prison, presumably for his significant participation in the Kristallnacht of 1938. Two further criminal proceedings ended in November 1949 and September 1950 with acquittals. 

Appler lived in Gunzenhausen until his death on 21 December 1978.

References

1892 births
1978 deaths
People from Neustadt (Aisch)-Bad Windsheim
People from the Kingdom of Bavaria
Nazi Party politicians
Members of the Reichstag of the Weimar Republic
Members of the Reichstag of Nazi Germany
Sturmabteilung officers
SS officers
German Army personnel of World War I
Military personnel of Bavaria
German expatriates in Egypt